Vonjiniaina (born Vonjiniaina Annie Ratovonirina; June 26, 1975), is a contemporary Malagasy artist, gold medalist in sculpture at the fifth Jeux de la Francophonie in 2005.

Biography 
Born to diplomatic parents, Vonjiniaina moved to Germany at the age of 13. She then went to Illkirch-Graffenstaden to pursue studies in marketing at the Robert-Schuman University Institute of Technology.

Vonjiniaina began her artistic career with the exhibition De l'Ame à la Matière (From Soul to Matter) and mainly received attention following her series of sculptures, Paroles de boue (Words of Mud). This group of works appeared in multiple exhibitions internationally. She has exhibited at the Dakar Biennale (2002), the Hôtel de Ville (2003), the Musei Di San Salvatore in Lauro in Rome (2012), and the Gallery of African Art in London (2014).

Vonjiniaina works mainly in landscape, drawing inspiration from Madagascar's cultural heritage: "Dans mon travail, il y a toujours la terre, d'abord comme matière mais aussi comme essence de l'humain. Dans le travail de la terre existe un vecteur spirituel qui lie géographie et histoire, espace et temps, homme et Dieu, réel et imaginaire, âme et matière."

Exhibitions

Painting 
 1999: De l'Ame à la Matière, galerie Art Déco, Antananarivo, Madagascar
 2001: Sens Cri at the Art Deco gallery in Antananarivo, Madagascar
 2003: Latitudes, l'Hôtel de ville, Paris
 2006: Paroles de Boue, 
 2007: Angaredona, Madagascar
 2011: Une Nuit pour Reconstruire un Village à Madagascar, Paris
 2012: Fabula in Art, at the Musei Di San Salvatore in Lauro, Rome  and Murs de Silence at Is'Art Galerie, Madagascar
 2014: Pop-up Africa at the Gallery of African Art, London

Sculpture 
 2002: Installation, Dakar Biennale, Senegal
 2003: Padaratana, Institut Français de Madagascar
 2005: Installation, Jeux de la Francophonie, Niamey, Niger
 2006: Elabakana, Madagascar and residency workshop with sculptor Michael Bethe Sélassié
 2007: 30 et Presque Songe, with Joël Andrianomearisoa, Madagascar
 2009: Tsinjo-Dia at Espace Rarihasina, Antananarivo, Madagascar

Other media 

 2003: Scenography for the Contemporary Dance Biennial of Africa and the Indian Ocean, Madagascar
 2003: Member of the jury for the second edition of the Short Film Festival in Madagascar
 2007: Scenography of the Africa and Indian Ocean Biennial of Photography, in Madagascar
 2010: Scenography of Sar'nao Month of Photography in Madasgascar
 2013: Co-writer for Le Mythe d'Ibonia , at the Alliance Française de Tananarive, with Hiary Rapanoelina and Henri Randrianerenana

Awards 

 Gold medal in sculpture, Jeux de la Francophonie, 2005
 Officer of the Order of Arts, Letters and Culture. Madagascar, 2012

References

External links 

 The Chinese portrait of Vonjiniaina, www.nocomment.mg, February 9, 2012
 Vonjiniaina at GAFRA
Vonjiniaina on Instagram

1975 births
Malagasy artists
Women installation artists
People from Antananarivo
Living people